Vitalia Diatchenko was the defending champion but withdrew before the tournament began.

Alycia Parks won her second consecutive WTA 125K title, defeating Anna-Lena Friedsam in the final, 6–4, 4–6, 6–4.

Seeds

Draw

Finals

Top half

Bottom half

Qualifying

Seeds

Qualifiers

Lucky losers

Qualifying draw

First qualifier

Second qualifier

Third qualifier

Fourth qualifier

References

External links
 Main draw
 Qualifying draw

2022 WTA 125 tournaments